Anh Sơn is a rural district of Nghệ An province in the North Central Coast region of Vietnam. As of 2009 the district had a population of 132,060. The district covers an area of 597 km². The district capital lies at Anh Sơn.

References

Districts of Nghệ An province